Chepén is a city of La Libertad Region and capital of the Chepén Province, in Peru. The city is a rice production center with the valleys of Chepén and Jequetepeque, and has an active trading with neighboring Guadalupe, Pacasmayo and San Pedro de Lloc and other towns. It has factories in industrial dyes, food and primary production.

Tourism
Chérrepe, is a beach of Chepén, La Libertad, Perú.

Notable people
Eduardo Gonzalez Viaña, writer.
Ercila Rabínes de Terrones, founder of Ercila Rabínes de Terrones 180 school.
Marcelina Astonitas Guanilo,
Fashion Designer, designed all clothing for first Miss Universe from Peru in 1957 Gladys Rosa Zender among other Miss Peru participants, later on went to NYC to work in Fashion and Design. Currently retired and lives in Lima, Peru and NYC.

See also
La Libertad Region

References 

Cities in La Libertad Region
Populated places in La Libertad Region